Acrolophus corvula is a moth of the family Acrolophidae. It is found in South America.

References

corvula
Moths described in 1914